Sir Lionel Earle,  (1 February 1866 – 10 March 1948) was a British civil servant.

Early life and education
Earle was born in Marylebone, London in 1866. He was the second son of Charles William Earle of the Rifle Brigade, and his wife, Maria Theresa Villiers, daughter of Edward Ernest Villiers and a horticultural writer known as Mrs C. W. Earle. He was educated at Marlborough College and studied at Göttingen University and the Sorbonne. He matriculated at Merton College, Oxford in 1886, but did not take a degree.

Career

Earle was assistant secretary the Royal Commission on the Paris Exhibition, 1898, and was appointed an acting second secretary in the diplomatic Service on 15 January 1900. He transferred to Ireland in September 1902, when he was appointed an additional private secretary to Lord Dudley, the recently created Lord Lieutenant of Ireland, and served as such until the following year. He was private secretary to Lord Crewe from 1907 to 1910, and to Lord Harcourt in 1910–12. He was permanent secretary to the Office of Works from 1912 until 1933.

Earle was appointed a Knight Commander of the Order of the Bath (KCB) in the 1916 New Year Honours, a Knight Commander of the Royal Victorian Order (KCVO) in 1921  and a Knight Grand Cross of the Royal Victorian Order (GCVO) in 1933. He was also a Commander of the Belgian Order of the Crown.

Sources
Concise Dictionary of National Biography.

References

1866 births
1948 deaths
Knights Commander of the Order of the Bath
Knights Grand Cross of the Royal Victorian Order
Companions of the Order of St Michael and St George
Alumni of Merton College, Oxford
People from Marylebone